Desmia cristinae is a moth in the family Crambidae. It was described by Schaus in 1912. It is found in Costa Rica and Honduras.

References

Moths described in 1912
Desmia
Moths of Central America